A Gentle Gangster is a 1943 black-and-white drama film, directed by Phil Rosen and produced by A. W. Hackel.

Cast
Molly Lamont as Ann Hallit
Barton MacLane as Mike Hallit
Dick Wessel as Steve Parker
Joyce Compton as Kitty Parker
Jack La Rue as Hugo
Cy Kendall as Al Malone
Rosella Towne as Helen Barton
Ray Teal as Joe Barton
Crane Whitley as Reverend Hamilton
Elliot Sullivan as Lefty
Anthony Warde as Charles

External links

Films directed by Phil Rosen
Republic Pictures films
American black-and-white films
1943 crime drama films
1943 films
American crime drama films
1940s American films
1940s English-language films